KB, kB or kb may stand for:

Businesses and organizations

Banks 
 KB Kookmin Bank, South Korea
 Kaupthing Bank, Iceland
 Komerční banka, Czech Republic
 Kasikornbank, Thailand
 Karafarin Bank, Iran

Libraries 
 National Library of Sweden
 National Library of the Netherlands

Sport
 Kalix BF, a Swedish bandy club
 Kjøbenhavns Boldklub, a sports club, Copenhagen, Denmark

Other businesses and organizations
 KB Home, a US house builder
 KB Lager,  Australia
 KB Toys, US
 K&B, a New Orleans, Louisiana, US drugstore
 Druk Air (IATA code: KB), Bhutan airline

People
 Kevin Bartlett (Australian rules footballer) (born 1947)
 KB (rapper) (born 1988), Kevin Elijah Burgess
 KB Killa Beats (born 1983), Zambian record producer

Science and technology

Biology 
 Kilo-base pair (kb or kbp), length of D/RNA molecule

Computing 

 Kilobit (kb), 1,000 bits
 Kilobyte (kB), 1,000 bytes
 Knowledge base
 Microsoft Knowledge Base ID prefix

Vehicles 
 KB series, International Harvester trucks
 Isuzu Faster or KB, a pickup truck
 Isuzu D-Max or KB, a pickup truck
 NZR KB class, a New Zealand steam locomotive

Other uses in science and technology
 Boltzmann constant, k or kB
 Base dissociation constant Kb
 Ebullioscopic constant Kb, relating molality to boiling point elevation
 Kauri-butanol value Kb, a measure of solvent performance

Other uses 
 King's Buildings, a University of Edinburgh campus
 Knowledge Bowl, a quiz competition
 Former Knight Companion of the Order of the Bath
 Kuala Belait, a town in Brunei
 WWKB, or KB Radio 1520
 A slang name for marijuana